This is a list of films which have placed number one at the weekend box office in the United Kingdom during 1998.

See also 
 List of British films — British films by year

References

1998
United Kingdom
Box office number-one films